Carl Oppermann produced electric cars under his own name from 1898 to 1902, and through Carl Oppermann Electric Carriage Co. Ltd. from 1902 to 1907. His firm made its own batteries to power a variety of vehicles mostly having open body styles, and produced a number of electric taxis. The King of Siam purchased an Oppermann electric in 1905.

Carl Johann David Oppermann was born on 11 April 1838 in Hamburg, Germany. By about 1862 he had established himself as a watch manufacturer and mechanical engineer in Clerkenwell, London, UK. He died at Barnet, Middlesex, England on 30 April 1916 and was survived by his wife Elizabeth Jane née Tunstill (30 May 1843 – 1 August 1934) and their numerous children including their son Carl Tunstill John Oppermann (born 13 March 1861).

See also
 List of car manufacturers of the United Kingdom

References

Electric vehicles introduced in the 20th century
Defunct motor vehicle manufacturers of England